Mark Yeager is an American biologist, focusing in cardiac gap junction membrane channels, integrin water channels, rotavirus, reovirus and retrovirus. Yeager is a professor at University of Virginia and an Elected Fellow of American Association for the Advancement of Science.

Education
Mphil, Yale University
BS, Carnegie Mellon University
PhD, Yale University
MD, Yale School of Medicine

References

Fellows of the American Association for the Advancement of Science
21st-century American biologists
Carnegie Mellon University alumni
Yale School of Medicine alumni
Year of birth missing (living people)
Living people